The Charlotte Thunder are a professional indoor American football team based out of Charlotte, North Carolina. They are members of the American Arena League (AAL) and play their home games at the Bojangles' Coliseum. The team was formed prior to the 2018 season as the Carolina Energy and was co-owned by Daniel Rudmann and head coach Ervin Bryson. In 2020, the team was sold to an ownership group led by former NFL players, Ted Ginn Jr. and Thomas Davis Sr. and rebranded as the Charlotte Thunder. The team also has several other minority owners including former players Jeff Reed and Frank Garcia.  They are the fourth team to play in Charlotte behind the Charlotte Rage and Carolina Cobras, both formerly of the Arena Football League, and the Carolina Speed of the American Indoor Football Association.

Season-by-season results

References

External links
 Official website

American football teams in Charlotte, North Carolina
American Arena League
American football teams established in 2017
2017 establishments in North Carolina
American football teams in North Carolina